Realtime to Paradise (リアルタイム・トゥー・パラダイス) is the second album by Kiyotaka Sugiyama released by VAP on March 21, 1987. The album was his second to peak at No. 1 on the Oricon charts.

The album includes the single "Saigo no Holy Night," which charted at No. 2 on the Oricon charts.

Track listing

Charts

References 

1987 albums
J-pop albums